Aenetus lewinii is a moth of the family Hepialidae. It is known from New South Wales and Queensland.

The larvae feed on various trees, including Casuarina and Leptospermum species. They bore in the stems of saplings.

References

Moths described in 1856
Hepialidae